Musical evenings at St Donatus in Zadar, Croatia is an international music festival held since 1961 at Church of St Donatus and at other historical locations of the city of Zadar. Performing are renowned musicians from Croatia and abroad.

The manifestation is concentrated exclusively on classical music. Since the initial idea of Zadar's conductor Pavle Dešpalj and its realization 61 festival years have already passed, making the Musical Evenings in St Donatus one of the oldest Croatian festivals. Its quality as well as the ingenuity and concept of its programmes keep refreshing the hot Zadar summer nights each year.

During six decades of its existence, Musical Evenings at St Donatus as a musical manifestation has undergone many conceptual changes. During the first festival summers the aim was to bring to Zadar prominent performing artists from all over the world as well as Croatia but also to strengthen local performing forces, allowing them to equally participate in the programme. Owing to the Yugoslav wars, the Evenings were not renewed until 1994.

References

External links
 
  Croatian National Tourist Board

1961 establishments in Croatia
Music festivals established in 1961
Music festivals in Croatia
Music festivals in Yugoslavia
Tourist attractions in Zadar
Zadar